refers two rest areas that are located on the Fukagawa Route of the Shuto Expressway in Tatsumi, Kōtō, Tokyo.

Tatsumi No. 1 Parking Area
Tatsumi No. 2 Parking Area